Sebastián Oscar López (born 13 October 1985) is an Argentine professional footballer who plays as a midfielder for Argentino de Quilmes.

Career
López started his senior career with Lugano in 2005. Eleven goals arrived across eighty-one appearances in Primera D Metropolitana. In 2008, López moved up to Primera B Metropolitana with Deportivo Armenio. He scored goals against Estudiantes, Comunicaciones and Temperley in his first campaign, before netting at least once in each of the following five seasons. In total, the midfielder participated in over two hundred Primera B Metropolitana games for Deportivo Armenio. On 2 July 2014, López joined fellow third tier team Deportivo Español. In season two, López started forty of their forty-two league fixtures.

January 2016 saw López sign for Deportivo Riestra. His first goal for the club didn't arrive until match number one hundred and three versus Fénix in April 2019, in the succeeding season after their twelve-month stint in Primera B Nacional following 2016–17 promotion.

Career statistics
.

References

External links

1985 births
Living people
Sportspeople from Buenos Aires Province
Argentine footballers
Association football midfielders
Primera D Metropolitana players
Primera B Metropolitana players
Primera Nacional players
Club Atlético Lugano players
Deportivo Armenio footballers
Deportivo Español footballers
Deportivo Riestra players
Argentino de Quilmes players